WNHO-LD (channel 44) is a low-power independent television station in Defiance, Ohio, United States. Owned by American Christian Television Services, it is sister to Lima-licensed religious/secular independent station WLMA (channel 44). The two stations share studios near Elida, northwest of Lima; WNHO-LD's transmitter is located in Sherwood, Ohio. WNHO-LD's broadcast area includes most of Defiance, Fulton, Henry, Paulding and Williams counties.

Until 2018, the station was operated by iHeartMedia's WDFM radio at 98.1 FM. Its schedule consisted primarily of syndicated programming with a variety of topics including gardening, motorsports, agriculture, home improvement, and personal health.

Despite its low-power status, WNHO-LD has been determined to be a "must-carry" station by the Federal Communications Commission (FCC), making it available on all local cable systems in addition to its over-the-air coverage.

History
Lankenau Small Media Network, which owned WDFM radio, established WNHO-LD on March 2, 1992, on channel 19 as W19BN. In March 1997, its calls changed to WDFM-LP.

In December 1998, Jacor Broadcasting, which would later merge with Clear Channel, acquired WDFM and WDFM-LP from Lankenau.

WDFM-LP later moved its frequency from channel 19 to channel 26 to make way for the digital signal of Fort Wayne's WISE-TV, which broadcasts its digital signal on channel 18.

On April 20, 2007, Clear Channel entered into an agreement to sell its entire television stations group to Newport Television. However, WDFM-LP was not included in the sale, as it was operated directly by the radio station, instead of the television group.

In July 2018, iHeartMedia filed to donate WDFM-LP to American Christian Television Services (the owners of WTLW in Lima, Ohio) under the condition that the WDFM call letters be changed to something "mutually agreeable" to both parties. The transfer was complete on October 5, 2018, at which point the station's call sign was changed to WNHO-LP.

In early 2019, WTLW announced plans to upgrade WNHO-LP to a digital station and move its broadcast channel to 35. WNHO-LD signed on the air on October 4, 2019.

Technical information

Subchannels
The station's digital signal is multiplexed:

Previous logo

References

External links
Michiguide: WDFM info, with reference to WDFM-LP

NHO-LD
Television channels and stations established in 1992
1992 establishments in Ohio